Target Field Station (formerly known during construction under the names of Minneapolis Intermodal Station, Downtown Minneapolis Ballpark station and The Interchange) is a multimodal commuter train and light rail station in Minneapolis, Minnesota. Located in the North Loop area of Downtown Minneapolis, the station is named for Target Field, the Minnesota Twins baseball stadium. METRO Blue Line light rail service started November 14, 2009; Northstar Line commuter rail service started November 16, 2009; METRO Green Line light rail service started on June 14, 2014.

Layout

The station adjoins Target Field, and commuter rail trains can wait next to the stadium. The station has an island platform serving commuter rail and two sets of light rail island platforms. The first was opened in 2009, the second in 2014.

The commuter train platform runs northeast–southwest below at ground level between two tracks. The 2009 light rail station platforms run northwest–southeast on the 5th Street North bridge over the commuter rail tracks, while the 2014 platforms were built northwest of the 2009 set. By the commuter platform is a third track on the northwest side that allows freight traffic to bypass the platform tracks.

History

The first railroad tracks in Minneapolis on the west bank of the Mississippi were placed in this location by the St. Paul and Pacific Railroad which later became the Great Northern Railway. The Minneapolis and St. Louis Railway and Great Northern Railway laid parallel east/west tracks in this location platted as Dakota Avenue/4th Avenue between 3rd Street North and 5th Street North. The Minneapolis and St. Louis Track was the southern track and the Great Northern track was the northern track. This grade separation was agreed in 1890 after much litigation. The rail bed was lowered to form what is known as "The Cut" below the street grade today.

The station is near the sites of other former Minneapolis railroad depots. The first rail depot in downtown Minneapolis, for the St. Paul and Pacific, was located east near the present-day Fourth Street along the same tracks. The Minneapolis and St. Louis railway freight and passenger depots were located at the East side of Washington Avenue, also east of the present Target Field station. The Electric Short Line Railway (Luce Line) depot was located at the northwest corner of 7th St. North and 3rd Avenue North. It was shared with the Minneapolis, St. Paul, Rochester and Dubuque Electric Traction Company (known as the Dan Patch Line and later the Minneapolis, Northfield and Southern Railway), as well as the Minneapolis, Anoka and Cuyuna Range Interurban railway.

The last passenger rail station to operate in Minneapolis was the Minneapolis Great Northern Depot which was served by Amtrak until 1978.

2009 station

The station was opened in 2009, to serve Northstar Commuter Rail and the Hiawatha Line, now METRO Blue Line. The light rail line was extended from its existing terminus at Warehouse District / Hennepin Avenue to serve the new station. This was the first time for Minneapolis regaining access to passenger rail for 31 years.

The Minnesota Twins pledged $2.6 million for its construction.

2014 addition
The 2014 addition was designed by New York-based Perkins Eastman, to provide additional platform space for both METRO Green and Blue Lines, as well as provide community gathering space.

Future plans
The Green Line extension, also known as the Southwest Corridor to Eden Prairie and the Blue Line extension, also known as the Bottineau Boulevard to Brooklyn Park will serve Target Field. The Northern Lights Express to Duluth would originate at Target Field.

Potential regional rail routes from Target Field station include the Dakota Rail Corridor to Hutchinson, the Dan Patch Corridor to Northfield, the Little Crow Line to Willmar, the Red Rock Corridor to Hastings, and the Minnesota Prairie Line to Norwood Young America.

Operation
Light rail trains from both Blue and Green Lines serve both the 2009 and 2014 platforms. Each train makes two stops at the station to serve both sets of platforms.

The Northstar Commuter Rail one-way fares from this station range from $1.00 to $3.25 on weekdays and $1.00 to $2.75 on weekends, depending on the destination. The Northstar Line provides five morning and five afternoon trips each weekday.

Recognition
Target Field Station won a 2015 Institute Honor Award for Regional and Urban Design by the American Institute of Architects.

Additional photos

References

External links
 
 Metro Transit - Target Field Station
 Downtown Minneapolis Ballpark Station, Northstar Corridor Development Authority (NCDA)

Metro Green Line (Minnesota) stations in Minneapolis
Metro Blue Line (Minnesota) stations in Minneapolis
Northstar Line stations
Railway stations in the United States opened in 2009
Railway stations in Minneapolis